Burckhardt Compression AG is a Winterthur-based Swiss firm specialising in reciprocating compressors. According to the enterprise, it is the world leader in this field, with its products being used around the world in various industrial applications.

The company was founded by Franz Burckhardt as a small mechanical workshop in Basel in 1844, which he expanded to a factory making air and vacuum pumps. The firm was taken over by Sulzer in 1969 and became independent again in 2002 after a management buyout.

In May 2006, Burckhardt Compression announced its intention to go public on the Swiss stock exchange, probably in June 2006.

References 

 
 

Gas compressors
Manufacturing companies of Switzerland
Companies based in Winterthur
Manufacturing companies established in 1844
Companies listed on the SIX Swiss Exchange